The Day I Met El Chapo: The Kate del Castillo Story (Spanish: Cuando conocí al Chapo: La historia de Kate del Castillo) is an American biographical documentary streaming television series, based on real facts about the meeting of Kate del Castillo with El Chapo. The series is created and produced by David Broome and directed by Carlos Armella, and that premiered on Netflix on October 20, 2017.

References

External links 
 

2017 American television series debuts
2017 American television series endings
Spanish-language Netflix original programming
Works about Mexican drug cartels